Larisa Tutova (born 18 October, 1969, Peschanokopskoye, Rostov Oblast) is a Russian political figure and a deputy of 7th and 8th State Dumas.
 
From 1991 to 2010, Tutova taught history and social studies at the secondary school in Peschanokopskoye. In 2011, she was appointed the director of the school. From 2013 to 2016, she was the deputy of the Legislative Assembly of the Rostov Oblast. In 2016, she was elected deputy of the 7th State Duma from the Rostov constituency. Since September 2021, she has served as deputy of the 8th State Duma.

References
 

 

1984 births
Living people
United Russia politicians
21st-century Russian politicians
21st-century Russian women politicians
Eighth convocation members of the State Duma (Russian Federation)
Seventh convocation members of the State Duma (Russian Federation)
Russian Presidential Academy of National Economy and Public Administration alumni